"I'm Not Cool" is a song recorded by South Korean singer-songwriter Hyuna, released on January 28, 2021 under P Nation, simultaneously with the accompanied music video and her seventh EP by the same name, the latter is which the song is from.

Composition
The song was written by Psy, Hyuna and Dawn. The song is composed in the key E-flat minor and has 116 beats per minute and a running time of 2 minutes and 54 seconds.

Commercial performance
"I'm Not Cool" debuted at number 73 on the South Korean Gaon Digital Chart and the next week the song peaked at number 9, making it Hyuna's first Top 10 entry since her 2016 song How's This?, which peaked at number 5. In the US, the song debuted at number 19 on the Billboard World Digital Song Sales and the next week the song peaked at number 8.

Music video and promotion
On January 26, a first teaser for the music video of "I'm Not Cool" was released. On the next day, the second teaser was released. On January 28, the official music video was released. On January 28, Hyuna held her first comeback stage for the song on Mnet's M Countdown. The next day, Hyuna performed the song on KBS2's Music Bank and You Hee-yeol's Sketchbook. On January 30, Hyuna performed the song on MBC's Show! Music Core and on SBS's Inkigayo the following day.

Accolades

Credits and personnel 
Credits adapted from Melon.

 Hyuna – vocals, songwriting, composing, chorus
 Psy – songwriting, composing
 Dawn – songwriting, composing 
 Yoo Geon-hyeong – producer
 Space One – producer
 Slyme Young – producer

Charts

Year-end Chart

Release history

References 

2021 songs
2021 singles
Songs written by Hyuna
Hyuna songs
K-pop songs
Korean-language songs